Gerson dos Santos Peres (2 May 1931 – 21 April 2020) was a Brazilian politician, lawyer and journalist from the state of Pará.

Life
Gerson Peres was a lawyer by formation after finishing his law degree at Federal University of Pará, however outside of his political career he worked mostly as a journalist, employed by well known local newspapers such as O Liberal and A Província do Pará.

As a politician, his first public position was as a member of the Legislative Assembly of Pará, which he held from 1955 to 1979.

In 1978, Peres was indirectly elected Vice Governor of Pará, took office in 1979 and finished his tenure in 1983.

In 1982, he was elected member of the Chamber of Deputies representing his birth state of Pará and after 4 consecutive successful re-elections he remained a deputy until the end of his tenure in 2003.

In 2002, Peres chose not to seek re-election as a deputy and instead opted to run for a seat in the Brazilian Senate at the 2002 Brazilian general elections. This time his attempt was unsuccessful.

After his failure to secure a seat at the Brazilian Senate, he was once again elected member of the Chamber of Deputies. He remained at the Brazilian lower house from 2007 to 2011 and that was his last political position.

Death
On 21 April 2020, Peres died in Belém from COVID-19 during the COVID-19 pandemic in Brazil.

References

1931 births
2020 deaths
Vice Governors of Pará
Members of the Chamber of Deputies (Brazil) from Pará
Members of the Legislative Assembly of Pará
Brazilian journalists
Brazilian Labour Party (current) politicians
National Renewal Alliance politicians
Democratic Social Party politicians
Progressistas politicians
Deaths from the COVID-19 pandemic in Pará